Vasilissa (300–309) is venerated as a child martyr by the Russian Orthodox Church.  According to tradition, she was a small child when martyred, suffering in Nicomedia not long after the death of Anthimus. According to Russian Orthodox tradition, the torturers covered her whole body with wounds, but she remained faithful to  Jesus Christ.

According to legend she was tortured with fire and wild beasts, yet remained unharmed. Her torturer, Alexander, seeing these wonders, repented and became a Christian. Vasilissa is said to have gone into a field, and fallen to her knees in prayer, thanking God for her endurance under torture, and she was killed while praying. She died in 309.

References
 Holy Martyr Vasilissa from Holy Protection Russian Orthodox Church

300 births
309 deaths
Christian child saints
4th-century Christian martyrs
4th-century Roman women
4th-century Christian saints
Greek children
Late Ancient Christian female saints